CA35 or CA-35 may refer to:

 California's 35th congressional district
 California State Route 35
 California State Route 35 (1934–1964), the road originally designated California State Route 35
 , a United States Navy heavy cruiser
 Calcium-35 (Ca-35 or 35Ca), an isotope of calcium